WDR 2 is a radio station owned and operated by the Westdeutscher Rundfunk (WDR) public broadcasting organization in Germany. It focuses on contemporary pop and rock music for an adult audience and on information. It is also WDR's broadcast sport events channel and produces the live soccer reports programme ARD-Bundesligakonferenz, which covers the results of all games played in the national Bundesliga and is relayed by up to 20 other radio stations across Germany.  The channel reaches an average of 3.3 million listeners daily.

Frequencies

FM
Aachen / Euregio 100.8 MHz
Arnsberg 99.4 MHz
Bad Oeynhausen 99.1 MHz
Dortmund 87.8 MHz
Eifel 101.0 MHz
Erftkreis 88.4 MHz
Höxter 96.4 MHz
Ibbenbüren 96.0 MHz
Kleve 93.3 MHz
Köln 98.6 MHz
Kölner Bucht 100.4 MHz
Lübbecke 96.0 MHz
Märkischer Kreis and Kreis Olpe 93.5 MHz
Monschau 94.2 MHz
Münsterland 94.1 MHz
Oberbergischer Kreis 91.8 MHz
Ostwestfalen 93.2 MHz
Remscheid 95.7 MHz
Rheinisch-Bergischer Kreis 100.4 MHz
Rhein / Ruhr 99.2 MHz
Sauerland 102.1 MHz
Schmallenberg 93.8 MHz
Siegen 97.1 MHz
Siegerland 101.8 MHz
Warburg 91.8 MHz
Wittgensteiner Land 92.3 MHz
Wuppertal 99.8 MHz

DAB Digital Radio
Berlin: Channel 7D
North Rhine-Westphalia: Channel 11D

Satellite
Astra 1H (19.2° East)
Tr. 93

References

External links
Livestream (RealAudio or Windows Media)

Westdeutscher Rundfunk
Radio stations in Germany
Radio stations established in 1950
1950 establishments in West Germany
Mass media in Cologne